The 2019 Tarleton State Texans football team represented Tarleton State University in the 2019 NCAA Division II football season. They were led by head coach Todd Whitten, who is in his 10th season at Tarleton State. The Texans played their home games at Memorial Stadium and were members of the Lone Star Conference.

Schedule
Tarleton State announced their 2019 football schedule on April 30, 2019.

References

Tarleton State
Tarleton State Texans football seasons
Lone Star Conference football champion seasons
Tarleton State Texans football